This is the discography of American hip hop group Brand Nubian

Albums

Compilation album

Singles

Charted singles
This list include releases by Grand Puba and Sadat X.

References 

Discographies of American artists